The 2022–23 Texas State Bobcats women's basketball team represents Texas State University during the 2022–23 NCAA Division I women's basketball season. The basketball team, led by twelfth-year head coach Zenarae Antoine, play all home games at the Strahan Arena along with the Texas State Bobcats men's basketball team. They are members of the Sun Belt Conference.

Roster

Schedule and results

|-
!colspan=9 style=| Non-conference Regular Season
|-

|-
!colspan=9 style=| Conference Regular Season
|-

|-
!colspan=12 style=| Sun Belt Tournament

See also
 2022–23 Texas State Bobcats men's basketball team

References

Texas State Bobcats women's basketball seasons
Texas State Bobcats
Texas State Bobcats women's basketball
Texas State Bobcats women's basketball